House at 520 Hostageh Road, also known as Lyndhurst, is a historic seasonal cottage located at Rock City in Cattaraugus County, New York. It was built in 1903 and is a -story Swiss Cottage wood-frame dwelling with hipped roofs and an L-shaped front porch.  Also on the property is a contributing gambrel-roofed barn containing the original privy.

It was listed on the National Register of Historic Places in 2009.

Gallery

References

Houses on the National Register of Historic Places in New York (state)
Houses completed in 1903
Houses in Cattaraugus County, New York
National Register of Historic Places in Cattaraugus County, New York